is a 2005 Japanese film directed by Yuichi Sato, starring Tetsuji Tamayama and Asami Mizukawa.

Plot
Two young adults, Mitsuru and his girlfriend, Maki, kidnap a little girl and hold her for ransom to pay off a drug-related debt. As they hide out at an abandoned school, they attempt to call the girl's parents only to find out from her parents she has been dead for a year. Mitsuru's friends also arrive, with ulterior motives of their own.

Soon, members of the group are brutally killed by an unseen force. Is the mysterious little girl responsible, or is something far more sinister at work?

External links
 Bloody-disgusting.com's review
 Dread Central's review
 

2005 horror films
2005 films
Japanese supernatural horror films
Films directed by Yūichi Satō
2000s Japanese films